Keremeos Centre is a ghost town located in the Similkameen Country region of British Columbia, Canada.  The town is situated on the west side of Keremeos Creek.

References

Ghost towns in British Columbia
Similkameen Country